Cyprian Godebski may refer to:
 Cyprian Godebski (poet)
 Cyprian Godebski (sculptor)